Laurel Creek is a river in Delaware County, New York. It flows into the Roods Creek east-northeast of Hale Eddy.

References

Rivers of New York (state)
Rivers of Delaware County, New York